Merche Romero Gomes (born 27 November 1976) is a Portuguese model and TV Presenter of Andorran descent. She is best known for once being the girlfriend of footballer Cristiano Ronaldo who was 9 years younger than her. She announced the end of her relationship with him on a Portuguese television show in 2006.

Biography
She is of Spanish and Portuguese descent. She was born in Andorra and currently lives and works in Portugal. She gained notoriety for being the girlfriend of Manchester United superstar Cristiano Ronaldo, 9 years younger than her.

Personal life
Merche was linked to Cristiano Ronaldo. Although various photos were published of Cristiano Ronaldo and Merche Romero together on holiday and at various events, Cristiano refused to speak of his girlfriend. But Cristiano never explicitly confirmed nor denied the relationship. 
On 20 September 2006 Merche announced the end of their relationship, while being interviewed for the Portuguese television show Só Visto!: "Cristiano and myself are no longer together."

References

External links
Site Oficial de Merche Romero 

Merche Romero Profile 

1976 births
Living people
Portuguese female models
Portuguese television presenters
Portuguese people of Andorran descent
Portuguese women television presenters